The Raton is a short mountain river that flows through the Alpes-Maritimes department of southeastern France. It flows into the Cians north of Rigaud.

It flows from west to east along the following communes:
 north side: Guillaumes, Beuil
 south side: Auvare, Puget-Rostang, Rigaud

References

Rivers of France
Rivers of Alpes-Maritimes
Rivers of Provence-Alpes-Côte d'Azur